Baigujing is a demon from the 16th century novel Journey to the West. The name is translated into English as White Bone Spirit in the William John Francis Jenner translation. Baigujing is a shapeshifting demoness, and in her true form she is depicted as a skeleton.

Baigujing was a demon who desired to eat the flesh of Tang Sanzang. She disguised herself as a village girl and offered him and his disciples poisonous fruits. Due to her strong powers, only Sun Wukong could detect that she was a demon. He hit her with his staff, seemingly killing her. The group's leader Tang Sanzang is angered at Sun Wukong and performs the Band-tightening spell but Sha Wujing placates the situation. Sun Wukong tried to explain to everyone what she was but they didn't believe him. Tang Sanzang believed she was an innocent and buried her. Having survived the attack, she dug underground to recover.

She returned a second time disguised as an elderly woman. She lied to the group, causing them to believe that the village girl from earlier was her daughter. Sun Wukong sees through her disguise once again and kills her. The group's leader Tang Sanzang is angered again at Sun Wukong and performs the Band-tightening spell again but Sha Wujing placates the situation and the group continues to not believe him. She returns a third time as an elderly man who lies about having a daughter and wife. The group immediately felt guilty as they believed they were the two women Sun Wukong had slain. She taunts Sun Wukong, provoking him, and engaging him into attacking her by using his powers, and only he could hear her.

Having a short-temper due to his provocation by her, he finally beats her with his staff and kills the demon, revealing that she was just a skeleton spirit. Sun Wukong shows this to Tang Sanzang, who initially believes him, but Zhu Bajie convinces Tang Sanzang that Sun Wukong transformed the corpse into a skeleton to evade the Band-tightening spell. Tang Sanzang is angry at Sun Wukong at his reckless slaying and scolds him. He cuts his ties with Sun Wukong and sends him away. Hurt by his master's words, Sun Wukong leaves and returns to Water Curtain Cave. In his absence, Tang Sanzang gets caught by another demon – the Yellow Robe Demon that Zhu Bajie and Sha Wujing cannot defeat. Zhu Bajie has no choice but is forced to ask for Sun Wukong's help to save Tang Sanzang and the group finally starts to believe in Sun Wukong — who also forgives them after they apologized to him for their misunderstandings due to Baigujing's deception — for what he can see what others can't see and continue to their journey West.

Adaptations
In The Monkey King Conquers the Demon, Baigujing is the main antagonist. This film has a few differences from the novel:
 When she took on the identity of a young woman, she claimed that she's a widow.
 Her second impersonation is a young boy who is the son of her first.
 In her last impersonation, she did manage to avoid being killed by the Monkey King hence, succeeded in capturing the Tang Priest.
 She is the daughter of the Nine-Tailed Vixen (the mother of the Golden and Silver Horned Kings in the novel), with the film adapting the plot of Sun Wukong killing and replacing her.

In the film, The Monkey King 2, she is the main antagonist and tries to persuade Sun Wukong to betray Tripitaka to so that he can be free of the headache ring.  

In the film Kung Fu Panda: The Paws of Destiny, Baigujing is a major antagonist.

In the TV series Lego Monkie Kid, Baigujing (referred as Lady Bone Demon) is the main antagonist in the second and third season. As she did in journey to the west, she took a little girlʻs body, which was Vital to her takeover of megaopolis.

References

Journey to the West characters
Chinese deities
Fictional demons and devils